Kolongo or Kolongo Tomo is a village and rural commune in the Cercle of Macina in the Ségou Region of southern-central Mali. The commune covers an area of approximately 484 square kilometers and includes 37 villages. In the 2009 census the commune had a population of 37,648. The village lies on the Fala de Boky-Wéré, an ancient branch of the Niger River that now forms part of the irrigation system of the Office du Niger.

References

External links
.

Communes of Ségou Region
Communities on the Niger River